Mary Luz Andía Arotaipe (born 9 November 2000) is a Peruvian racewalking athlete. She qualified to represent Peru at the 2020 Summer Olympics in Tokyo 2021, competing in women's 20 kilometres walk.

References

External links
 
 

 

2000 births
Living people
Peruvian female racewalkers
Athletes (track and field) at the 2020 Summer Olympics
Olympic athletes of Peru
People from Cusco
People from Arequipa
21st-century Peruvian women